The Hyatt Regency Portland (or Hyatt Regency Portland at the Oregon Convention Center) is a high-rise building and Hyatt hotel in Portland, Oregon, United States. Opened in December 2019, the hotel is located on Northeast Holladay Street at 2nd Avenue, in the Lloyd District, across the street from the Oregon Convention Center. The hotel also has 39,000 square feet of convention space.

History
Operations were suspended in March 2020 as a result of the coronavirus pandemic. The hotel reopened on May 24, 2021.

References

External links

 

2019 establishments in Oregon
Hotel buildings completed in 2019
Hotels in Portland, Oregon
Portland,  Oregon
Lloyd District, Portland, Oregon
Northeast Portland, Oregon